The 2012–13 season is the 21st year of football played by Aldershot Town F.C. and their 5th in The Football League.

Match results

Football League Two

Matches

FA Cup

Football League Cup

Football League Trophy

Aldershot Town F.C. seasons
Aldershot Town